Elections were held in the state of Western Australia on 20 February 1965 to elect all 50 members to the Legislative Assembly and 15 members to the 30-seat Legislative Council. The Liberal-Country coalition government, led by Premier Sir David Brand, won a third term in office against the Labor Party, led by Opposition Leader Albert Hawke.

Electoral changes
The Legislative Council election held on the same day was the first since significant changes to the Council's structure and manner of voting under the Constitution Acts Amendment Act (No.2) 1963 (No.72 of 1963). The Act abolished the 10 three-member provinces which had existed almost unaltered since 1900, and created 15 new two-member provinces. Voting became compulsory and the property franchise was abolished, and the practice of having separate Legislative Council elections in May of every even-numbered year was abolished—the Council's members would now go to the voters at the same elections as members of the Legislative Assembly, although the rotational system where one member per province would retire at each election remained in effect, and unlike the Assembly, the Council's term expired on 22 May every three years, rather than at the election itself.

A number of transitional arrangements were necessary to put these changes into effect. Those who had terms expiring on 21 May 1964, and five of the ten whose terms were to expire on 21 May 1966 (those who had the lowest winning margins at the 1960 election) would retire on 21 May 1965. The remaining 15 members were eligible to be appointed to new provinces for terms expiring on 21 May 1968.

Results

Legislative Assembly

|}

 408,462 electors were enrolled to vote at the election, but 11 seats (22% of the total) were uncontested—3 Labor seats (one less than 1962) representing 23,717 enrolled voters, 3 LCL seats (one less than 1962) representing 22,175 enrolled voters, and 5 Country seats (two more than 1962) representing 26,937 enrolled voters.

Legislative Council

|}

Post-election pendulum

See also
 Members of the Western Australian Legislative Assembly, 1962–1965
 Members of the Western Australian Legislative Assembly, 1965–1968
 Candidates of the 1965 Western Australian state election

References

Elections in Western Australia
1965 elections in Australia
1960s in Western Australia
February 1965 events in Australia